Carl-Olof Morfeldt (1919–2003) was a Swedish geologist and businessman. He was a founder and CEO of Hagconsult AB, an enterprise dedicated to geotechnical consultancy. In 1964, he became also its majority shareholder. Morfeldt was the foremost authority on geotechnical studies for building in Sweden. An expert on building tunnels and rooms in bedrock, Morfeldt was awarded an honorary doctorate from Chalmers University of Technology in 1979. In 1999, he was awarded the prize Geologist of the Year by Naturvetarna.

References

1919 births
2003 deaths
Academic staff of the KTH Royal Institute of Technology
Stockholm University alumni
20th-century Swedish geologists
Geotechnical engineers